Daisy Osakue (born 16 January 1996) is an Italian discus thrower who came 5th at the 2018 European Athletics Championships. She competed at the 2020 Summer Olympics, in Discus throw.

Osakue holds the NCAA Division II women's discus record of 61.35 m, and her throw of 63.66 m on 31 July 2021 during the qualifying round of the 2021 Tokyo Olympics established a new national record for Italy.

Biography
Of Nigerian and later acquired Italian citizenship, Osakue was born in Turin to Nigerian parents. She became a naturalized Italian citizen at the age of 18.

Athletics accomplishments
She attended Angelo State University in San Angelo, Texas, where she became an eight-time NCAA Division II All-American in the women's discus.  She is a two-time Division II national champion (2018 and 2019). In 2019 she set the Division II record for the longest discus throw at  61.35 m (201 feet, 4 inches. She is also a second team Division II All-American in the high jump.
In 2018, after having established the 4th all-time Italian performance in the discus throw, she obtained the standard FIDAL and EAA and was called by DT Elio Locatelli to represent Italy at the European Championships in Berlin. In 2021 she participated in the 2020 Olympics in Tokyo, representing Italy.

Assault
On 30 July 2018, in her home town of Moncalieri, an egg was thrown at Osakue from a passing car. Her eye needed to be surgically operated on to remove a shard of the egg's shell. Osakue believed the egging was because of racism. Three young men, including the son of a local Democratic Party councillor, were indicted; one admitted seven cases of egging strangers in the last two months. The case went to trial without an aggravated charge of racial motivation, which was not contested by prosecutors. Many Italian politicians, foreign and domestic news websites, published fake news about the case.

Statistics

National records
Under 23
 Discus throw: 59.72 m ( San Angelo, Texas, 8 April 2018) - current holder

Personal bests
Discus throw: 63.66 m ( Tokyo, 31 July 2021)

Achievements

National titles
Osakue won three national championships at individual senior level.

Italian Athletics Championships
Discus throw: 2020, 2021
Italian Winter Throwing Championships
Discus throw: 2022

See also
 Italian all-time lists - discus throw
 Naturalized athletes of Italy
 Italy at the 2018 European Athletics Championships

References

External links
 

1996 births
Living people
Italian female discus throwers
Italian people of Nigerian descent
Italian sportspeople of African descent
Naturalised citizens of Italy
Sportspeople from Turin
Universiade gold medalists in athletics (track and field)
Universiade gold medalists for Italy
Athletics competitors of Fiamme Azzurre
Athletics competitors of Fiamme Gialle
Athletes (track and field) at the 2018 Mediterranean Games
Medalists at the 2019 Summer Universiade
Mediterranean Games competitors for Italy
Italian Athletics Championships winners
Athletes (track and field) at the 2020 Summer Olympics
Olympic athletes of Italy